Aglaia meridionalis is a species of plant in the family Meliaceae. It is endemic to Queensland, Australia.

References

meridionalis
Near threatened flora of Australia
Sapindales of Australia
Flora of Queensland
Near threatened biota of Queensland
Taxonomy articles created by Polbot